Robert C. Shinn Jr. (born November 28, 1937) is an American politician who served in the New Jersey General Assembly from the 8th Legislative District from 1985 to 1994.

Born in Mount Holly, New Jersey, Shinn attended Rancocas Valley Regional High School and Drexel Institute of Technology (since renamed as Drexel University). He left college early to serve in the United States Army during the Korean War as an aircraft mechanic. He served as mayor of Hainesport Township in 1973 and 1974, and took office on the Burlington County Board of Chosen Freeholders in 1977, leaving in 1985 to take office in the State Assembly.

References

1937 births
Living people
County commissioners in New Jersey
Drexel University alumni
Mayors of places in New Jersey
People from Hainesport Township, New Jersey
People from Mount Holly, New Jersey
Politicians from Burlington County, New Jersey
Rancocas Valley Regional High School alumni
Republican Party members of the New Jersey General Assembly
United States Army personnel of the Korean War